Hasrajiyah (also spelled Hasrajieh) is a village in northern Syria located west of Homs in the Homs Governorate.

Demographics
According to the Syria Central Bureau of Statistics, Hasrajiyah had a population of 519 in the 2004 census. Its inhabitants are predominantly Sunni Muslims. In 1838, its inhabitants were noted as being predominantly Turkmen.

References

Bibliography

 

Populated places in Talkalakh District
Turkmen communities in Syria